Ingornachoix Bay is a natural bay on the island of Newfoundland in the province of Newfoundland and Labrador, Canada.  It is located approximately mid-way along the western shore of the Great Northern Peninsula. Home to three beautiful villages, Port aux Choix, Port Saunders and Hawkes Bay.

References

Bays of Newfoundland and Labrador